Uhre is a Danish surname. Notable people with the surname include:

 Lars Uhre (born 1972), Danish badminton player and coach
 Maria Uhre Nielsen (born 1999), Danish football player
 Mikael Uhre (born 1994), Danish football player

Danish-language surnames